Nexidia is an interaction analytics software company that provides indexing and mining software for audio and video.

About
Nexidia software helps government agencies and companies operating in various sectors such as healthcare, technology, retail, insurance, financial services, utilities and technology.

History
The creation of the software began in the early 1990s. At that time, Emory University and Georgia Tech worked together with the desire to archive speeches by then United States Senator Sam Nunn.

The company was founded in 2000 as Fast-Talk Communications, Inc. Founder Mark Clements studied speech recognition for 25 years and Georgia Tech graduate student Peter Cardillo created the software over five years to help recognize individual speech sounds. In 2003, the company changed its name to Nexidia.

Acquisition

January 11, 2016 NICE Systems announced the acquisition of Nexidia.

Awards
Technology and Engineering Achievement Emmy Award for Phonetic Indexing and Timing - 2015
Speech Technology Magazine - Star Performer Award for bringing "Advanced Science to Analytics" - 2015 
Operational Innovation Award - Customer Excellence for Nexidia Interaction Analytics - 2014
Speech Technology Magazine - 2014 Star Performer
Customer Magazine - Speech Technology Excellence Award - 2014
Speech Technology Magazine, Market Winner for Speech Analytics - 2007, 2008, 2009, 2010, 2011, 2012, 2013
IBC Design and Innovation Award – 2013
StudioDaily Prime Award Winner, Post Production Innovation - 2013 (Boris Soundbite)
Best of Show Vidy Award, 2011 
TV Technology, Star Award 2011
Frost & Sullivan, New Product Innovation Award, 2010
NAB Best of Show, Black Diamond Award, 2010 
CRM Magazine, Service Rising Star Award, 2010

References

External links 

Software companies based in Georgia (U.S. state)
Defunct software companies of the United States
2000 establishments in the United States
2000 establishments in Georgia (U.S. state)
Software companies established in 2000
Companies established in 2000